My First Days in the White House is a book written by Huey Long. Called his "second autobiography" and published posthumously in 1935, it emphatically laid out his presidential ambitions for the election of 1936.

Summary
Approaching the 1936 presidential elections, Louisiana Senator Huey Long details a political fantasy in which he is president of the United States. Through imaginary conversations Long outlines his policies, including the "Share Our Wealth" plan, a balanced budget, an income cap of 500,000 dollars per year, and a program to eliminate dust storms. He also proposes to "reorganize and modernize" the American air forces, presumably as either a more autonomous component of the Army, or a separate branch altogether (later carried out in the National Security Act of 1947). Long fantasizes about his inauguration as President of the United States, detailing that he would be sworn in on the Bible his father had read to him and his brothers and sisters.

He also detailed his nomination picks for his cabinet, listed below. Long does not name a Secretary of Agriculture or Postmaster General, instead saying that those offices should be filled "from the recommendations of the farm organizations" and "according to their merit and record of service" respectively, with Long appointing two unnamed individuals. The book also suggests that the Director of the Budget should be elevated to a cabinet position, with Al Smith of New York filling the role. The book does not name Long's vice president.

References

External links
 eBook, in HathiTrust digital library

1935 non-fiction books
American political books
American memoirs
Books published posthumously
Works by Huey Long